The Toronto Rock are a lacrosse team based in Toronto playing in the National Lacrosse League (NLL). The 1999 season was the 2nd in franchise history and 1st time as "the Rock" after a season in Hamilton, Ontario as the Ontario Raiders.

The Rock finished on top of the NLL standings, winning its first division in franchise history. The Rock beat the Philadelphia Wings in the semifinals, to advance to the championship game.  Their victory over the Rochester Knighthawks in this game gave them their first NLL championship.

Regular season

Conference standings

Game log
The 1999 Regular Season games are listed below.

Playoffs

Game log
Reference:

Player stats

Runners (Top 10)

Note: GP = Games played; G = Goals; A = Assists; Pts = Points; LB = Loose Balls; PIM = Penalty minutes

Goaltenders
Note: GP = Games played; MIN = Minutes; W = Wins; L = Losses; GA = Goals against; Sv% = Save percentage; GAA = Goals against average

Awards

Roster

See also
1999 NLL season

References

External links
 

Toronto
National Lacrosse League Champion's Cup-winning seasons
1999 in Toronto
1999 in Canadian sports